The women's 1500 metres event at the 1986 Commonwealth Games was held on 1 and 2 August at the Meadowbank Stadium in Edinburgh.

Medalists

Results

Heats
Qualification: First 4 of each heat (Q) and the next 2 fastest (q) qualified for the final.

Final

References

Athletics at the 1986 Commonwealth Games
1986